World Without Shame is a 1962 British naturist film directed by Donovan Winter and starring Yvonne Martell. It was directed by Donovan Winter and Russell Gay.

References

External links
World Without Shame at IMDb
World Without Shame at TCMDB

British drama films
Nudity in film
1960s English-language films